Karnavati University (KU) is a private university located in Uvarsad, near Gandhinagar, Gujarat, India. The University was established in 2017 by the Karnavati Medical and Educational Trust through The Gujarat Private Universities (Amendment) Act, 2017, which also established Swarnim Startup & Innovation University, P P Savani University and Indrashil University.

Academics
The University offers undergraduate and post graduate degrees in management, design, law, liberal arts, commerce, media studies and dentistry through its six constituent colleges:
 Karnavati School of Dentistry (KSD)
 Unitedworld Institute of Design (UID)
 Unitedworld School of Law (UWSL)
 Unitedworld School of Business (UWSB)
 Unitedworld School of Computational Intelligence (USCI)
 Unitedworld School Of Liberal Arts and Mass Communications (USLM)

Affiliations
Karnavati University is recognized by the University Grants Commission (UGC). It is also a member of Association of Commonwealth Universities (ACU).

Incubation Centres
To promote entrepreneurship and innovation and encourage startups, Karnavati University has established two Incubation Centres,

 Sector-agnostic >> Karnavati Innovation & Incubation Foundation (KIIF)
 Defence-sector focused >> Defence Design and Technology Incubator of India (DDTII)

For more details visit Incubators & Startups at Karnavati University.

References

External links

Universities in Gujarat
Educational institutions established in 2017
2017 establishments in Gujarat
Private universities in India
Education in Gandhinagar